The 2011 SMU Mustangs football team represented Southern Methodist University in the 2011 NCAA Division I FBS football season. The Mustangs were led by fourth year head coach June Jones and played their home games at Gerald J. Ford Stadium. They are a member of the West Division of Conference USA. They finished the season 8–5, 5–3 in C-USA to finish in third place in the West Division. They were invited to the BBVA Compass Bowl where they defeated Pittsburgh 28–6.

Schedule

Awards and award watch lists
Kyle Padron was named to the Davey O'Brien Award and Manning Award watch lists.
Kelvin Beachum, Ja’Gared Davis, Taylor Reed and Taylor Thompson were named to the watch list for the Lombardi Award.
Beachum was named to the Outland Trophy watch list, Thompson made the Nagurski Award List, Cole Beasley and Darius Johnson were named to the Biletnikoff Award watch list.
Zach Line was named to the watch list for the Maxwell and Doak Walker Award, Thompson And Margus Hunt were selected to the Pony Express Award watch list
Blake McJunkin was named to the Rimington Trophy watch list.

Rankings

Game summaries

Texas A&M

This game was the 78th meeting of the SMU Mustangs and the Texas A&M Aggies. The previous match-up was September 17, 2005, a game in which Texas A&M defeated SMU with a final score of 66–8. After the Mustangs lost in College Station, Texas A&M now leads the series 42–29–7.

UTEP

This game was the 19th meeting of the SMU Mustangs and the UTEP Miners. They last met in the previous season on November 6, 2010, when UTEP defeated SMU with a final score of 28–14. After winning 28–17, SMU leads the series 11–8. Ja'Gared Davis was named Conference USA Defensive Player of the Week for his 4th quarter fumble recovery in the end zone for a touchdown.

Northwestern State

This game was the 1st meeting of the SMU Mustangs and the Northwestern State Demons. After winning 40–7, SMU leads the series 1–0.

Memphis

This game was the 4th meeting of the SMU Mustangs and the Memphis Tigers. They last met on November 8, 2008, when Memphis defeated SMU with a final score of 31–26. The Mustangs' 42–0 victory in the Liberty Bowl Memorial Stadium marks the first time SMU has defeated Memphis and Memphis now leads the series 3–1.

TCU

This game marked the 91st edition of the Battle for the Iron Skillet. The two teams last met on September 24, 2010, when TCU defeated SMU 41–24. After the Mustangs' overtime victory in Fort Worth, SMU now trails the series 40–43–7. This marked SMU's second victory over a ranked team since receiving the NCAA Death Penalty for the 1987–8 seasons. After this game, SMU received 5 points in the AP Poll and 10 points in the Coaches Poll. SMU became the first team to beat TCU in Fort Worth since the 2007 season. Wide receiver Darius Johnson was named Conference USA Offensive Player of the Week for his two receiving touchdowns, 12 catches, and 152 yards in the game. This game was the last away win for SMU in the 2011 season.

This would be the Mustangs' last win over the Horned Frogs until 2019.

UCF

This game was the 4th meeting of the SMU Mustangs and UCF Knights. The two teams last met on December 4, 2010, during the 2010 Conference USA Football Championship Game when UCF defeated SMU 17–7. The Mustangs' 38–17 victory marks the first time SMU has defeated UCF and UCF now leads the series 3–1. For his third straight 300-yard game, QB J.J. McDermott was named Conference USA Offensive Player of the Week. PR Richard Crawford was named Conference USA Special Teams Player of the Week for his 92-yard punt return for a touchdown which ties the all-time SMU record.

Southern Miss

This game was the 3rd meeting of the SMU Mustangs and Southern Miss Golden Eagles. The two teams last met on November 29, 2008, when Southern Miss defeated SMU 28–12. Southern Miss' 27–3 victory propelled them into the top 25 and extends their lead in the overall head-to-head record to an undefeated 3–0.

Tulsa

This game marked the 19th meeting of the SMU Mustangs and the Tulsa Golden Hurricane. They last met in the previous season on October 9, 2010, where SMU defeated Tulsa with a final score of 21–18. Following Tulsa's 38–7 victory this season, SMU now leads the series 12–7.

Tulane

This game marked the 20th meeting of the SMU Mustangs and the Tulane Green Wave. They last met in the previous season on October 30, 2011, where SMU defeated Tulane with a final score of 31–17. Following SMU's 45–24 victory, Tulane now lead the series 12–8. This victory made SMU bowl eligible.

Navy

This game marked the 16th meeting of the SMU Mustangs and the Navy Midshipmen. The two teams have a heated rivalry in which they compete for the Gansz Trophy. They last met in the previous season on October 16, 2010, where Navy defeated SMU with a final score of 28–21. Following Navy's 24–17 victory, the Midshipmen now lead the series 9–7. This loss marked SMU's only loss in Ford Stadium in the 2011 season as well as SMU's only loss to a team with an overall losing record.

Houston

This game marked the 26th meeting of the SMU Mustangs and the Houston Cougars. They last met in the previous season on October 23, 2010, where Houston defeated SMU with a final score of 45–20. Following Houston's 37–7 victory, Houston now leads the series 17–9–1.

Rice

This game marked the 89th meeting of the SMU Mustangs and Rice Owls in the Battle for the Mayor's Cup. They last met in the previous season on October 2, 2010, where SMU defeated Rice with a final score of 42–31. Following SMU's 27–24 victory, SMU now leads the series 48–40–1.

Pittsburgh (BBVA Compass Bowl)

This game marked the 6th meeting of the SMU Mustangs and the Pittsburgh Panthers. They last met on January 1, 1983, in the Cotton Bowl Classic, where SMU defeated Pittsburgh 7–3. After SMU won the 2012 BBVA Compass Bowl, the series now stands in the Mustangs' favor 3–2–1

Roster

References

SMU
SMU Mustangs football seasons
Birmingham Bowl champion seasons
SMU Mustangs football